Komandorski Village was a temporary low-rent housing development in Dublin, Alameda County, California. It was built to hold the overflow of military personnel and families from Camp Parks. It was sold by the United States government to a housing authority in 1954, and was required to be demolished in 1984.

References

External links

Unincorporated communities in California
Unincorporated communities in Alameda County, California
Geography of Pleasanton, California